Koromogawa No.2 Dam  is a gravity concrete & fill dam (compound) dam located in Iwate Prefecture in Japan. The dam is used for flood control. The catchment area of the dam is 39 km2. The dam impounds about 25  ha of land when full and can store 2360 thousand cubic meters of water. The construction of the dam was completed in 1971.

See also
List of dams in Japan

References

Dams in Iwate Prefecture